Andria L. Bennett is an American politician. She was a Democratic member of the Delaware House of Representatives, representing District 32. She was elected in 2012 to replace her husband, Brad Bennett, who had decided not to seek reelection after a second arrest for drunk driving. Bennett was formerly an adjunct faculty member at Delaware Technical Community College.

Electoral history
In 2012, Andria Bennett won the Democratic primary with 421 votes (61.6%), and went on to win the general election with 4,097 votes (63.3%) against Republican nominee Ellis Parrott.
In 2014, Bennett won the general election with 1,860 votes (57.6%) against Republican nominee William McVay.
In 2016, Bennett won the general election with 4,241 votes (60.5%) against Republican nominee Patricia McDaniel Foltz.
In 2018, Bennett won the general election with 3,510 votes (62.3%) against Republican nominee Cheryl Precourt.

Committee assignments
Bennett currently serves on the following committees:
Agriculture Committee
Capital Infrastructure Committee
Corrections Committee
Economic Development/Banking/Insurance & Commerce Committee (Vice Chair)
Gaming and Parimutuels Committee (Chair)
Joint Committee on Capital Improvement
Revenue and Finance Committee
Veterans Affairs Committee

Domestic abuse arrest and retirement
According to Delaware State Police, Bennett was arrested on December 13, 2020, on charges of third-degree assault after a domestic dispute. She was arraigned and released on her own recognizance and the Delaware Department of Justice confirmed that charges against Bennett were dropped in February 2021, at the victim's request. After the arrest, she decided to not run for re-election in 2022.

References

External links
Official page at the Delaware General Assembly
 

Living people
Democratic Party members of the Delaware House of Representatives
Women state legislators in Delaware
21st-century American women politicians
21st-century American politicians
People from Dover, Delaware
Year of birth missing (living people)